Place Jean-Macé  is a plaza located in the 7th arrondissement of Lyon in France.

History 

In 1892, the Avenue Maréchal de Saxe was extended towards the south (the current avenue Jean Jaurès). North of the railway, it crossed paths with Gerland (currently rue Renan) and Avignon Street (now rue Elie Rochette), forming an enclosed square. Built in the first part of the 19th century, the fort du Colombier and the wall that connected the height of the Vitriolerie were destroyed in the 1890s. A new public square was then built on the vacant land.

Points of Interest Nearby 

 Town Hall of 7th district whose construction was completed in 1920 by architect Charles Meysson. It houses the works of the painter Pierre Descombes Combet.
 Library of the 7th district
 Gare de Lyon-Jean Macé  (railroad station)
 Vélo'v two bicycle pickup stations on the square

Near
 The Berthelot center, which houses  :
 Center for History of Resistance and Deportation
 Institute for Political Science of Lyon
 Berges du Rhône railroad hub
 Cinema Comoedia
 University of Lyon 2 and Louis Lumière
 Hôpital Saint-Luc Saint-Joseph
 Blandan Park

Public transport 
Place Jean-Macé is served by:
 Metro Line B (station Jean Macé)
 tram T2 
 Bus lines C4, C7, C12, C14, 35, S3 and ZI6.
TER station opened in 2009 is situated on the south side of the square.

Events on the square 

 Market in the square, on Wednesday and Saturday morning
 The market for booksellers, once per month

7th arrondissement of Lyon
Squares in Lyon